Kaspa is a rural locality (a selo) in Shebalinsky District, the Altai Republic, Russia. The population was 372 as of 2016. There are 5 streets.

Geography 
Kaspa is located 42 km southeast of Shebalino (the district's administrative centre) by road. Verkh-Apshuyakhta is the nearest rural locality.

References 

Rural localities in Shebalinsky District